Hannah Southwell (born 4 March 1999) is an Australian professional rugby league footballer who currently co-captains the Newcastle Knights in the NRL Women's Premiership.

She previously played for the Sydney Roosters in the NRLW and the Central Coast Roosters in the NSWRL Women's Premiership. Before switching to rugby league, she played soccer for the Newcastle Jets in the W-League and for the Australia rugby sevens team.

Background
Born in Newcastle, New South Wales, Southwell played junior rugby league for the Kotara Bears. At age 13, she gave up rugby league as she wasn't allowed to play anymore due to her age.

She is the older sister of Knights teammate Jesse Southwell.

Soccer

Club 
Southwell signed with Newcastle Jets in 2014. On 20 September 2014, she made her debut in a match against Perth Glory, becoming the league's youngest goalkeeper at the age of 15. She made six appearances for the team during the 2014–15 W-League season. Newcastle finished in fifth place during the regular season with a  record. During the 2015–16 W-League season, Southwell made 12 appearances for Newcastle and helped the team finish in sixth place with a  record.

International 
Southwell represented Australia in the under-17 and under-20 national teams. In January 2016, Southwell earned a call-up to training camp for the Australia women's national soccer team.

Rugby union
In late 2016, Southwell made the decision to switch codes and play rugby sevens. She made her first appearances for the Australian national team at the 2016 Oceania Women's Sevens Championship, Australia winning the Championship after defeating Fiji in the final.

Rugby league

2018
In 2018, Southwell returned to rugby league, joining CRL Newcastle in the NSWRL Women's Premiership. In June, she represented NSW Country at the Women's National Championships.

On 22 June, she made her debut for New South Wales, coming off the bench in a 16–10 win over Queensland. On 27 July, she signed with the St George Illawarra Dragons NRL Women's Premiership team. In Round 1 of the 2018 NRL Women's season, she made her debut in the Dragons' 4–30 loss to the Brisbane Broncos.

2019
In May, Southwell represented NSW Country at the Women's National Championships. In July, she joined the Sydney Roosters NRLW side.

In Round 1 of the 2019 NRL Women's season, she made her debut for the Roosters in a 12–16 loss to the New Zealand Warriors. In October, she represented Australia at the 2019 Rugby League World Cup 9s.

2020
In 2020, Southwell joined the Central Coast Roosters NSWRL Women's Premiership team. On 27 September, they defeated the North Sydney Bears 16–10 in the Grand Final.

After the game, she was named the RLPA Players' Champion.

2022
Southwell was a member of the Sydney Roosters team that won the premiership in the postponed 2021 NRL Women's season, playing in all seven matches including the Grand Final victory on 10 April 2022. 

In late May, Southwell was named in the 22-player extended squad for the New South Wales women's rugby league team, ahead of the women's State of Origin match on 24 June, 2022.

She played in the Roosters' 2021 Grand Final win over the St. George Illawarra Dragons.

On 1 June, the Newcastle Knights announced that local junior Southwell had signed to play for the club in the 2022 season. She made her club debut for the Knights in round 1 of the 2022 NRLW season against the Brisbane Broncos.

References

External links
Newcastle Knights profile
Sydney Roosters profile

1999 births
Living people
Australian women's soccer players
Newcastle Jets FC (A-League Women) players
A-League Women players
Women's association football goalkeepers
Australian female rugby sevens players
Australia international rugby sevens players
Sportswomen from New South Wales
St. George Illawarra Dragons (NRLW) players
Newcastle Knights (NRLW) players
Newcastle Knights (NRLW) captains
Footballers who switched code
Australian female rugby league players
Australia women's national rugby league team players
Sydney Roosters (NRLW) players